Mónica Pont Chafer (born 3 June 1969 in Bufali, Valencia) is a former long-distance runner from Spain, who won the Rotterdam Marathon on 13 April 1995, clocking 2:30:34. She represented her native country at the 1996 Summer Olympics in the women's marathon race, where she finished in 14th place.

Pont set her personal best (2:27:53) in the classic distance in the 1996 Osaka International Ladies Marathon. Her time from that event was then the second-best Spanish women's marathon time recorded, and it remains the Valencian record. Pont also set the Valencian record for the half-marathon in an event in Barcelona 1996, at 1:12:27, and held it for 22 years until Marta Esteban broke it in 2017.

Achievements

References

External links
sports-reference

1969 births
Living people
Spanish female long-distance runners
Olympic athletes of Spain
Athletes (track and field) at the 1996 Summer Olympics
Spanish female marathon runners